WCMR (1270 AM) is a radio station licensed to Elkhart, Indiana, United States.  The station is currently owned by Progressive Broadcasting System.  WCMR airs a full-time Southern Gospel format, using Salem Radio Networks' "Solid Gospel" format.

Until the summer of 2012, the station had utilized most of its weekday programming schedule for conservative talk as "Smart Talk 1270." "Smart Talk 1270" aired a variety of talk shows including; Bill Bennett, Dave Ramsey, and Hugh Hewitt.

History
The station went on the air as WCMR in 1956. WCMR broadcast a country music format for many years.  From July 5, 1993, until June 16, 2008, the station used the call sign WFRN, with Christian talk programming separate from sister WFRN-FM which focuses on contemporary Christian music.

References

External links
Solid Gospel 1270

Query the FCC's FM station database for W287BL
 Radio-Locator Information on W287BL

West Coast Midnight Run™ Gateway Portal

CMR (AM)
Radio stations established in 1956
1956 establishments in Indiana
CMR (AM)